Everything Must Go is a 1969 novel by the British writer Keith Waterhouse. Similar in theme to the plot of his earlier Billy Liar, a man working as an antique dealer lives out his daydreams but ends up finding himself in a horrible predicament.

References

Bibliography
 Weintraub, Stanley. ''British Dramatists Since World War II: M-Z. Gale Research Company, 1982.

1969 British novels
Novels by Keith Waterhouse
G. P. Putnam's Sons books